Mohammad Muneer Ahmed Al-Muattasim is a Jordanian footballer.

Honors and Participation in International Tournaments

In AFC Asian Cups 
2011 Asian Cup

In WAFF Championships 
2008 WAFF Championship
2010 WAFF Championship

References
Mohammad Muneer Officially Signs Up With Tishreen SC of Syria 
(Amman) Agrees to Transfer Muneer to Al-Ansar (KSA) 
(Amman) Officially Includes Muneer

External links 

 

1982 births
Living people
Jordanian footballers
Jordan international footballers
Expatriate footballers in Syria
Expatriate footballers in Saudi Arabia
Association football defenders
2011 AFC Asian Cup players
Al-Ansar FC (Medina) players
Saudi Professional League players
Syrian Premier League players